"This Is Always" is a popular song composed by Harry Warren with lyrics by Mack Gordon for the musical Three Little Girls in Blue.

Release 
The song was first recorded in May of 1946 by Bobby Byrne and His Orchestra and first released in June by George Paxton but the first theatrical release was in September of that same year.

Background 
Although it was written for Three Little Girls in Blue, it ended up being cut from the musical. Despite this, it became quite popular due to its numerous re-recordings and was placed at 14 for greatest radio audiences for a song in November 1946.

Notable recordings 

 Dick Haymes - This Is Always / Willow Road (1946)
Harry James & His Orchestra - This Is Always / I've Never Forgotten (1946)
Jo Stafford - This Is Always / I'll Be With You In Apple Blossom Time (1946)
Charlie Parker Quartet (feat. Earl Coleman) - Dewey Square / This Is Always (1947)
Chet Baker (feat. Bud Shank & Russ Freeman) - Chet Baker Sings And Plays (1955)
Gene Ammons and Earl Coleman - This Is Always / I've Had My Last Affair (1955)
Cab Calloway - Let's Swing! (1965)
Sammy Davis (feat. Sam Butera & The Witnesses) - When The Feeling Hits You! (1965)
Etta Jones - Sugar (1990)

References 

Jo Stafford songs
Cab Calloway songs
Sammy Davis Jr. songs
1940s jazz standards
1946 songs
Jazz songs
Songs with lyrics by Mack Gordon
Songs with music by Harry Warren